Old Tucson (formerly Old Tucson Studios) is an American movie studio and theme park just west of Tucson, Arizona, adjacent to the Tucson Mountains and close to the western portion of Saguaro National Park. Built in 1939 for the movie Arizona (1940), it has been used for the filming location of many movies and television westerns since then, such as Gunfight at the O.K. Corral (1957), Rio Bravo (1959), El Dorado (1966), Little House on the Prairie TV series of the 1970s–1980s, the film Three Amigos! (1986) and the popular film Tombstone (1993). It was opened to the public in 1960 as a theme park with historical tours offered about the movies filmed there, along with live cast entertainment featuring stunt shows, shootouts, can-can shows...as well as themed events. It is still a popular filming location used by Hollywood. It was closed permanently during Covid-19 but has recently re-opened under new management in early 2023.

Early history
Old Tucson was originally built in 1939 by Columbia Pictures on a Pima County-owned site as a replica of 1860s’ era Tucson for the movie Arizona (1940), starring William Holden and Jean Arthur. Workers built more than 50 buildings in 40 days. Many of those structures are still standing.

After Arizona completed filming, the location lay dormant for several years, until the filming of The Bells of St. Mary's (1945), starring Bing Crosby and Ingrid Bergman. Other early movies filmed on this set included The Last Round-Up (1947) with Gene Autry and Winchester '73 (1950) with James Stewart and The Last Outpost (1951) with Ronald Reagan. The 1950s saw the filming of Gunfight at the O.K. Corral (1957), The Lone Ranger and the Lost City of Gold (1958), Cimarron (1960), Last Train from Gun Hill (1959), and Rio Bravo (1959) among others.

Open to the public

In 1959, entrepreneur Robert Shelton leased the property from Pima County and began to restore the aging facility. Old Tucson re-opened in 1960, as both a film studio and a theme park. The park grew building by building with each movie filmed on its dusty streets. John Wayne starred in four movies at Old Tucson. Rio Bravo (1959) added a saloon, bank building and doctor's office; McClintock! (1963) added the McClintock Hotel; El Dorado (1966) brought a renovation of the storefronts on Front Street; and with Rio Lobo (1970) came a cantina, a granite-lined creek, a jail and a ranch house.

In 1968, a 13,000 square foot (1,208 square meter) soundstage was built to give Old Tucson greater movie-making versatility. The first film to use the soundstage was Young Billy Young (1968), starring Robert Mitchum and Angie Dickinson.

The park also began adding tours, rides and shows for the entertainment of visitors, most notably gunfights staged in the "streets" by stunt performers. One of the rides is a  narrow gauge railroad powered by two Chance Rides C.P. Huntington train sets, which encircles most of the property.

Old Tucson served as an ideal location for shooting scenes for TV series like NBC's The High Chaparral (1967–1971) with Leif Erickson and Cameron Mitchell where the ranch house survived the 1995 fire; the 1970s–1980s series Little House on the Prairie with Michael Landon, Kung Fu, and later Father Murphy, featuring Merlin Olsen and Petrocelli (1974–76) used the site. Three Amigos was a popular comedy movie shot there in the 1980s with Steve Martin, utilizing the church set. From 1989 to 1992, the western show The Young Riders filmed here and at the Mescal, Arizona sister site. The main street appears prominently in 1990s westerns such as Tombstone (1993) with Kurt Russell and Val Kilmer. A partial mirror set exists at Mescal and is featured in The Quick and the Dead (1995), with Sharon Stone and Gene Hackman which filmed all of the town of Redemption scenes at the studios.

Fire

On April 24, 1995, a fire destroyed much of Old Tucson Studios. Buildings, costumes, and memorabilia were lost in the blaze. Among the memorabilia destroyed was the wardrobe from Little House on the Prairie. Also lost in the blaze was the only copy of a short film about the history of Old Tucson Studios. This film included rare behind-the-scenes footage of stars such as William Holden, John Wayne, and Angie Dickinson. The Reno, a steam locomotive from the Virginia and Truckee Railroad on static display in the park, was also badly damaged.

The fire originated inside building 74, which was a sign shop. This building backed up to an entertainment venue and was located on Kansas Street across from the sound stage. A show had just finished there and the crowd was being escorted by the actors from the show. Within minutes, flames were discovered inside the shop and security radioed the front gate, which called 911. In the meantime, someone pulled a fire hose from just north of this location (outside the Rio Bravo Jail building). When it was discovered that the hose was not long enough, it was dropped and another hose was pulled from the area of Chinese Alley. However, the original hose was not turned off, which bled off the pressure to the second hose. 300 guests and employees were forced to evacuate the park. Tucson Estates Fire Department arrived in less than 10 minutes with one truck and two firemen. However, by this time the fire had progressed too quickly to be suppressed by this basic equipment. A multiple-alarm call was put out to dispatch more fire units. 100 pieces of equipment and over 200 firefighters were deployed from every fire department in the Tucson metro area, including Davis Monthan Air Force Base and the Arizona National Guard.

The wind was out of the west, pushing the fire into the sound stage and west along Kansas Street. Approaches to the fire were restricted by three propane tanks that had vented and were burning. The fire quickly turned into a firestorm with vortices of flames carrying burning shingles and wood throughout the park. Fire control efforts were hampered by high winds. Most of the buildings in the studio were classified as "Temporary Structures," meaning fire prevention devices such as sprinklers were not required. A large propane tank, stashes of black powder used in staging gunfights, and a diesel fuel tank demanded the attention of firefighters and much of the scarce water supply. So much water was used in the attempt to prevent an explosion that the surrounding areas became flooded, further impeding the firefighters as they attempted to wade through the mud. After four hours of firefighting, the flames were extinguished. The loss included all of Kansas Street and Front Street to the wash on the east side, the corner store on the west, and the sound stage. The Mission area was destroyed along with the Greer Garson house and the cantina from Rio Lobo. The south end of town and the Silverlake area were not affected. Damages were estimated to be in excess of $10 million ($15 million in 2013), with 25 buildings destroyed. Fortunately, there were no human casualties.

The remains of the sign shop building showed that the point of origin was in a trash can located in the building. Samples of items in the trash can and in the immediate area were collected and tested, and the tests were negative for any type of accelerant. There were no electrical lines or other sources of ignition in the immediate area, and it was too short of a time span to have been caused by a discarded cigarette. It was ruled that some person unknown had started the fire in the area of the waste basket, and that the person had intentionally set the fire with some source of open flame (such as a match).

The U.S. Bureau of Alcohol, Tobacco, Firearms and Explosives sent in a team of forensic accountants to look into a financial motive for the fire. It was determined that the owners and management of Old Tucson did not stand to get a financial benefit but would lose a considerable amount of money due to the fire. These facts ruled the owners out of any conspiracy to set the fire. The employees were then questioned and their backgrounds checked; however, nothing suspicious was found to implicate any employee in the fire. That left the motive as either revenge for some personal offense, or an amateur thrill arsonist. Because of where the fire started, it was felt that the person starting it must have some knowledge of the layout of Old Tucson. Employment records were checked and one individual was identified as having recently attempted to get a job at Old Tucson, but was turned down. This person became the primary suspect. The subject lived in the nearby area and frequented Old Tucson.

In the month following the Old Tucson fire, several other fires were started in the area of Tucson Estates, down the road from Old Tucson; this subject was identified as the primary suspect in those fires. He was located and questioned by detectives, and faced with the evidence from the Tucson Estates fires, at which point he confessed to having started those fires. However, before he could be questioned about the Old Tucson fire, he invoked his Miranda Rights, effectively stopping any further questioning. Not enough evidence could be collected to positively identify this suspect as the arsonist in the Old Tucson fire. No other information pointing to any other individual was ever found, and the case remains open to this day.

After 20 months of reconstruction, Old Tucson re-opened its doors on January 2, 1997. The sets that were lost were not recreated; instead, entirely new buildings were constructed, and the streets were widened. The Reno locomotive was cosmetically restored before the filming of Wild Wild West, in which it was featured as Union Pacific 119 in the scene at the driving of the final spike of the First transcontinental railroad, but was subsequently used in an explosion in the scene and is in need of additional restoration. The soundstage was not rebuilt. Film production at Old Tucson was seriously affected by the fire. In 2003, Old Tucson reduced its hours of operation, opening from 10am to 4pm. Focusing on seasonal events, Old Tucson hosts the popular Nightfall event for Halloween which runs through the month of October, Wednesday through Sunday nights.

Recent history

In 2011, Old Tucson embarked on a project to build new movie-quality sets that fill out the park, and restore the pre-fire feel of close-together buildings, providing the look and depth of a genuine old west town circa 1865–1900. “After the rebuild of Old Tucson following the 1995 fire, the town just didn’t have the same look and feel,” says Old Tucson CEO and General Manager Pete Mangelsdorf. “We started discussions with Bob Shelton several years ago to develop a plan to fill the empty space in Town Square with movie quality sets that bring the magic back.”

The Heritage Square Project, a 5,000-square-foot spread with three new streets lined with 12 new buildings, was completed in November 2011 at an estimated cost of $300,000. The design and construction of the new sets was led by Production Designer Gene Rudolf, credited with creating sets for movies including Young Guns II (1990), The Great Gatsby (1974), The Right Stuff (1983), Raging Bull (1980), Marathon Man (1976), and Three Days of the Condor (1975). The project added dressmaker shops, a general store and a blacksmith, and are part of "living history" presentations. One of the goals of the Heritage Project was to add "more programs that have to do with the different cultural aspects, the Hispanic culture, the Chinese culture, the Native American culture," said Mangelsdorf. Along those lines, another new exhibit now open to the public features a Tohono O'odham village as it would have appeared in the 1860s. It includes traditional houses, a garden and other facets of village life.

On Tuesday, September 8, 2020, Old Tucson, the Western-themed attraction that was the filming location of more than 400 feature-films and TV shows, closed indefinitely, with its future to be determined by Pima County.

The decision to close the Arizona landmark "was made with a heavy heart," according to Old Tucson general manager Terry Verhage, who said in a news release that the theme park would have remained in business "if not for the COVID-19 pandemic."

“We know how important Old Tucson is to our community, guests and employees,” he said. “We did everything possible to keep our loyal fans safe when we were open, but the ongoing COVID-19 public health protocols and restrictions limited park attendance to the point where Old Tucson could no longer stay in business.”

Pima County took over responsibility for the theme park on September 14, 2020, and "will seek ideas from potential operators and lessors about what Old Tucson could be in the future," the news release said.

On August 24, 2021, the Reno locomotive was acquired by the revived Virginia & Truckee Railroad and was trucked off the property. She arrived in Virginia City, Nevada for the first time since 1938 two days later.

While closed, Pima County Administrator said the county has invested over $1M on upgrading the site and repairing neglected items to prepare the facility for a new operator. 

On April 5, 2022, Pima County selected American Heritage Railways (AHR) as the new operators of Old Tucson (aka Old Tucson Studios). It would be operated as Old Tucson Entertainment, LLC. The famous sister-site, Mescal Movie Set, was not part of the deal and will not be operated by the new AHR operators.

This historic movie location and theme park will reopen on Oct 6, 2022 with the popular "Nightfall at Old Tucson" event followed by a new Christmas-themed event called "Yuletide at Old Tucson" on Nov 25, 2022. John Harper serves as Vice President and Chief Operating Officer of American Heritage Railways and will oversee the property’s Executive Team, General Managers, and key employees. John has over 10 years in the historic preservation industry as well. They plan to utilize the facility not only as a theme-park but also reinstate its history as a filming location with the addition of sets, backdrops, sound stage, and pre and post-production facilities in 2023.

In July 2022, the Arizona State legislature passed the Arizona Film Tax Incentive bill which would encourage productions to return to facilities like Old Tucson. The passage of this bill is likely to increase film production at Old Tucson. As of Sept. 2022, they have been fielding offers for film and tv series to resume.

Movies filmed at Old Tucson
Many films, not all of them Westerns, were shot at Old Tucson Studios in whole or in part including the following:

 1940: Arizona
 1945: The Bells of St. Mary's
 1947: The Last Round-up
 1950: Winchester '73
 1950: Broken Arrow
 1951: The Last Outpost
 1955: Strange Lady in Town
 1955: Ten Wanted Men
 1955: The Violent Men
 1956: Backlash
 1956: The Broken Star
 1956: Walk the Proud Land
 1957: 3:10 to Yuma
 1957: Gunfight at the O.K. Corral
 1957: The Guns of Fort Petticoat
 1957: Carbine Webb and the Four Sisters
 1957: Tale of Consequence
 1958: Buchanan Rides Alone
 1958: The Badlanders
 1958: Gunsmoke in Tucson
 1958: The Lone Ranger and the Lost City of Gold
 1959: Last Train from Gun Hill
 1959: Rio Bravo
 1959: The Hangman
 1960: Cimarron
 1960: Heller in Pink Tights
 1961: The Deadly Companions
 1961: Sounds of Arizona
 1961: A Thunder of Drums
 1962: Young Guns of Texas
 1963: McLintock!
 1963: Lilies of the Field
 1964: The Outrage
 1965: Arizona Raiders
 1965: The Great Sioux Massacre
 1965: The Reward
 1966: El Dorado
 1966: Johnny Tiger
 1966: Pistolero
 1967: Hombre
 1967: Return of the Gunfighter
 1967: The Last Challenge
 1967: The Way West
 1967: A Time for Killing
 1967: The Long Ride Home
 1967: Rango
 1968: The Mini-Skirt Mob
 1969: Heaven with a Gun
 1969: Lonesome Cowboys
 1969: Young Billy Young
 1969: Again a Love Story
 1969: The Mountain Men
 1969: Charro! 
 1969: Whatever Happened to Aunt Alice
 1970: Dirty Dingus Magee
 1970: C.C. & Company
 1970: Monte Walsh
 1970: Rio Lobo
 1971: Wild Rovers
 1971: The Animals
 1971: Ballad of the Old West
 1971: Bearcats!
 1971: Dirty Little Billy
 1971: Forgotten Man
 1971: Gunfight at the OK Corral
 1971: Moments of Destiny – The OK Corral
 1971: Scandalous John
 1971: Showdown at the O.K Corral
 1971: A Ton of Grass Goes to Pot
 1971: Yuma
 1971: Death of a Gunfighter
 1972: Joe Kidd
 1972: Moonfire
 1972: Rage
 1972: Night of the Lepus
 1972: Pocket Money
 1972: The Legend of Nigger Charley
 1972: The Life and Times of Judge Roy Bean
 1973: Guns of a Stranger
 1973: Boomtown Band and Cattle Company
 1973: The Man Who Loved Cat Dancing
 1973: Outlaw Legacy
 1974: Death Wish
 1974: A Knife for the Ladies
 1974: The Trial of Billy Jack
 1974: Abduction of St. Anne
 1974: Backtrack
 1974: The Gun and the Pulpit
 1974: The Hanged Man
 1974: Mark of Zorro
 1974: Pray for the Wildcats
 1974: Wish You Were Here
 1975: Posse
 1975: Go USA
 1975: Katherine
 1976: Hawmps!
 1976: The Last Hard Men
 1976: The Lizard
 1976: The Quest
 1976: Royce
 1976: A Star is Born
 1976: Tales of Nunundaga
 1976: Wanted: The Sundance Woman
 1976: The Outlaw Josey Wales
 1977: Another Man, Another Woman
 1977: Harlem Globetrotters
 1977: The Incredible Rocky Mountain Race
 1977: Stones
 1978: The American Cowboy
 1978: Wild and Wooly
 1978: Go West Young Girl
 1978: The Sacketts
 1979: The Villain
 1979: Authentic Life of Billy the Kid
 1979: Buffalo Soldiers
 1979: The Dooley Brothers
 1979: Frisco Kid
 1979: Hunter's Moon
 1979: Japanese Quiz Show
 1979: Wild Wild West Revisited
 1979: The Gambler
 1980: Tom Horn
 1980: Death Valley
 1980: High Noon part II: The Return of Will Kane
 1980: More Wild, Wild West
 1980: That's Incredible: Lost Dog
 1981: Father Murphy
 1981: The Cannonball Run
 1980: American Frontier
 1980: Ransom of Red Chief
 1983: Calamity Jane
 1983: Cannon Ball Run Part II
 1983: I Married Wyatt Earp
 1983: September Gun
 1983: The Reflection Natas
 1984: The Assumption
 1984: Flashpoint
 1984: Little Arliss
 1984: Revenge of the Nerds
 1985: The Ascension
 1985: Centurion Odyssey
 1985: Cowboy Up
 1985: Dream West
 1985: Go West-Sing West
 1985: Jackals
 1985: Le Grand Rallye
 1986: Buckeye and Blue
 1986: Here a Thief, There a Thief
 1986: It's the Girl in the Red Truck
 1986: Three Amigos
 1986: Stagecoach (TV movie)
 1987: Desperado #1
 1987: Desperado #2
 1987: Nobody Likes It Hot
 1987: Poker Alice
 1987: Walker
 1987: The Quick and the Dead (TV movie)
 1988: Ghost Town
 1988: Once Upon a Texas Train
 1988: Red River
 1988: Return of the Desperado
 1988: South of Reno
 1988: Stones for Ibarra
 1989: Desperado Badland Justice
 1989: El Diablo
 1989: Laughing Dead
 1989: Law at Randado
 1989: Third Degree Burn
 1989: Gore Vidal's Billy the Kid
 1990: Young Guns II
 1990: The Highwaymen
 1990: Two Fisted Tales
 1990: The Legend of Grizzly Adams
 1991: Four Eyes and Six Guns
 1991: Gunsmoke III: To the Last Man
 1991: Kid
 1992: California Dreaming
 1992: Ghosts of Ruby
 1992: Legends of the West
 1992: Newton's Apple
 1992: Showdown
 1992: Stay Tuned
 1993: Nemesis (filmed scenes in 1992)
 1993: Tombstone
 1993: Geronimo
 1993: Gunsmoke V: One Man's Justice
 1993: Horse Opera
 1993: Marshal Charley
 1993: Music of the West
 1993: Posse
 1994: The Last Bounty Hunter
 1994: The West
 1994: Terminal Velocity
 1994: Lightning Jack
 1995: Hard Bounty
 1995: The Quick and the Dead
 1995: Legend
 1995: Timemaster
 1995: Under the Hula Moon
 1997: Buffalo Soldiers
 1997: Los Locos
 2000: South of Heaven, West of Hell
 2002: Legend of the Phantom Rider
 2003: Ghost Rock
 2003: Gunfight at the OK Corral
 2004: Treasure of the Seven Mummies
 2005: Miracle at Sage Creek
 2005: Cutoff
 2005: Dual
 2005: Ghost Town
 2005: Wild West Tech – Gang Technology
 2006: The Dead Evil Seven Mummies
 2006: Wild and the West
 2007: Legend of Pearl Hart
 2007: The Wild West
 2008: Mad, Mad Wagon Party
 2011: To Kill a Memory
 2013: Hot Bath an’ a Stiff Drink
 2019:  The Legend of 5 Mile Cave

Some scenes from the 1994 arcade game Lethal Enforcers II: Gunfighters from Konami were also shot at Old Tucson Studios, along with The Last Bounty Hunter, Fast Draw Showdown, and Shootout at Old Tucson by American Laser Games.

Television
Many TV series and TV movies have had at least one episode filmed at Old Tucson in whole or in part including the following:

 1958–1961: Wanted Dead or Alive
 1959–1965: Rawhide
 1962:  Have Gun Will Travel
 1963:  Wagon Train
 1966–1969:  Death Valley Days
 1966–1971:  The High Chaparral
 1966/1971–72:  Bonanza
 1967:  Dundee and the Culhane
 1971:  Bearcats! (either the TV movie title that started the series or at least one episode)
 1972–1974:  Gunsmoke
 1972–1975:  Kung Fu
 1974–1975:  Petrocelli
 1975–1976:  The Young Pioneers
 1977–1979:  How The West Was Won
 1977–1983:  Little House on the Prairie
 1978:  The New Maverick (TV movie)
 1980: Hart to Hart
 1984:  Highway to Heaven
 1984:  Ripley's Believe it or Not
 1984:  Little House on the Prairie: Bless All the Dear Children (TV movie)
 1985–1988:  Webster
 1987:  Highway to Heaven (episode: "Why Punish the Children")
 1987:  Reading Rainbow (episode: "Meanwhile Back at the Ranch")
 1987: Love Among Thieves (TV movie)
 1988–1991:  The Young Riders
 1988:  One Life to Live
 1989:  America's Most Wanted
 1989:  WWF Prime Time Wrestling
 1990:  Unsolved Mysteries
 1998:  Magnificent Seven

See also

 Old Vegas
 Goldfield Ghost Town

References

External links

 Official site

American film studios
Buildings and structures in Tucson, Arizona
Culture of Tucson, Arizona
History of Tucson, Arizona
Landmarks in Tucson, Arizona
Tourist attractions in Tucson, Arizona
Western (genre) theme parks
1939 establishments in Arizona